Rimas Kostiuškevičius is a Lithuanian balloonist.

He competed in World Air Games in 2001 where he finished 76th. In 2005 World Championships he was 7th and in 2010 World Championships he finished 8th.

In 2013 European Championships Rimas finished 2nd, after his son Rokas Kostiuškevičius.

References 

Living people
Sportspeople from Marijampolė
Lithuanian balloonists
Year of birth missing (living people)